Central Building Research Institute (CBRI), located at Roorkee, Uttarakhand, India, is a constituent establishment of Council of Scientific and Industrial Research responsible for "generating, cultivating and promoting building science and technology" in India.

Directors 
Pradeep Kumar Ramancharla November 2022 - Present 
N.Gopalakrishnan: 
Girish Sahni: Aug. 2015 – December 2015
S. K. Bhattacharyya: 2009–2015
Ganesh Babu Kodeboyina: 2005 - 2007 
V. K. Mathur:  2000–2005
R. N. Iyengar: 1994–2000

References

External links
 

Scientific organisations based in India
Council of Scientific and Industrial Research
Research institutes in Uttarakhand
Research institutes established in 1947
Roorkee
Building engineering organizations
Engineering research institutes
1947 establishments in India
Construction industry of India
Building research

hi:वैज्ञानिक एवं औद्योगिक अनुसंधान परिषद
te:కేంద్రీయ భవన పరిశోధనా సంస్థానం (CBRI)